Zakharovo is a rural locality (a selo) and the administrative center of Zakharovsky District, Ryazan Oblast, Russia. Population:

References

Notes

Sources

Rural localities in Ryazan Oblast
Ryazansky Uyezd